Sir Arthur Langford, 2nd Baronet (circa 1652 – 29 March 1716) was an Anglo-Irish lawyer and politician.

Langford was the eldest son of Sir Hercules Langford, 1st Baronet and Mary Upton, and inherited his father's baronetcy in 1683. He entered Trinity College Dublin in 1670 and Lincoln's Inn in 1671. He was a devout Presbyterian and helped to found the presbyterian general fund in 1710. 

Between 1692 and 1693, Langford represented Duleek in the Irish House of Commons. He was subsequently elected to represent Coleraine from 1695 to 1713 and Antrim County between 1715 and his death in 1716. He was succeeded in his title by his brother, Henry Langford.

References

17th-century births
1716 deaths
17th-century Anglo-Irish people
18th-century Anglo-Irish people
Alumni of Trinity College Dublin
Baronets in the Baronetage of Ireland
Irish MPs 1692–1693
Irish MPs 1695–1699
Irish MPs 1703–1713
Irish MPs 1713–1714
Irish MPs 1715–1727
Irish Presbyterians
Members of Lincoln's Inn
Members of the Parliament of Ireland (pre-1801) for County Antrim constituencies
Members of the Parliament of Ireland (pre-1801) for County Londonderry constituencies
Members of the Parliament of Ireland (pre-1801) for County Meath constituencies